Percival "Percy" Hayles (24 October 1940 – 28 August 1978) was a Jamaican professional light/light welter/welterweight boxer of the 1950s, '60s and '70s who won the British Commonwealth lightweight title, and was a challenger for the Jamaican lightweight title against Bunny Grant, and World Boxing Council (WBC) light welterweight title and World Boxing Association (WBA) World light welterweight title against Carlos "Morocho" Enrique Hernandez Ramos, his professional fighting weight varied from , i.e. lightweight to , i.e. welterweight. He was the 1964 Men's Winner of the Jamaica Sportsperson of the year, he was killed when he was hit by a car while riding a bicycle near Kingston, Jamaica.

References

External links

Image - Percy Hayles

1940 births
1978 deaths
Lightweight boxers
Light-welterweight boxers
Place of birth missing
Place of death missing
Road incident deaths in Jamaica
Welterweight boxers
Jamaican male boxers
Cycling road incident deaths
20th-century Jamaican people